Burnrigg is a hamlet in Cumbria, England. It is located to the east of Carlisle. In 1887, The British Architect said "on a site particularly high and open, are two small two- storied blocks of tenements, in all thirty-two, two small rooms to each, no other accommodation except four privies".

See also
List of places in Cumbria

References

Hamlets in Cumbria
Wetheral